C. antarcticus may refer to:
 Cryptococcus antarcticus, a fungus species
 Cryptopygus antarcticus, the Antarctic springtail, an arthropod species native to Antarctica  and Australia